Inanidrilus leukodermatus is a species of annelid worm. It is known from poorly oxygenated intertidal and subtidal
carbonate sands in Belize (Caribbean Sea) and Bermuda (Atlantic Ocean).

References

leukodermatus
Invertebrates of Central America
Fauna of Bermuda
Fauna of the Caribbean
Fauna of the Atlantic Ocean
Animals described in 1979
Chemosynthetic symbiosis